Karkheh Rural District is a rural district (dehestan) in Hamidiyeh District, Ahvaz County, Khuzestan Province, Iran. At the 2006 census, its population was 10,189, in 1,779 families.  The rural district has 19 villages.

References 

Rural Districts of Khuzestan Province
Ahvaz County